San Gorgonio High School is a comprehensive senior high school in the San Bernardino City Unified School District. Its campus is located at the corner of Pacific Street and Arden Avenue on the border between San Bernardino and Highland, California.

Athletics
San Gorgonio is a member of the San Andreas League in the CIF Southern Section.

Alumni
 Robert Eatinger, CIA lawyer
 Denean Howard, Olympic gold medalist
 Sherri Howard, Olympic gold medalist
 Dirk Kempthorne, United States Secretary of the Interior from 2006 to 2009, 30th Governor of Idaho
 Bill Kernen, '66 College Baseball Head Coach, Cal State University Bakersfield
 Nate Meadors, professional football player
Stephanie Rehe, Women's Tennis Association player ranked No. 10 in 1989
 Kevin Stanfield, professional baseball player
 Freddie Toliver, professional baseball player

References

External links
San Gorgonio High School Home Page
 

Education in San Bernardino, California
High schools in San Bernardino County, California
Public high schools in California
1965 establishments in California